Dávid Zvara (born 22 July 1994) is a Hungarian football player who plays for Kaposvár.

Club statistics

References

External links
 Profile 
 MLSZ

1994 births
Sportspeople from Eger
Living people
Hungarian footballers
Association football midfielders
Egri FC players
Szolnoki MÁV FC footballers
Dunaújváros PASE players
Szeged-Csanád Grosics Akadémia footballers
Tiszakécske FC footballers
Kaposvári Rákóczi FC players
Nemzeti Bajnokság I players
Nemzeti Bajnokság II players
Nemzeti Bajnokság III players
21st-century Hungarian people